Sri Lankan Canadians refers to people from Sri Lanka who have arrived and settled in Canada. Among these immigrants include members from the Sinhalese, Tamil, Moor, Malay and Burgher ethnicities. According to the 2021 census there are 136,240 Sri Lankan-born persons in Canada.

Demographics
Sri Lankan Canadians are concentrated in the cities of Toronto (Malvern) and Montreal. According to the 2001 census, there are 62,000 Canadians who claim Sri Lankan ancestry, but only 10,000 claimed to be of Sinhalese ancestry. The number may not be an actual representation because many Tamil Canadians from Sri Lanka classify themselves as Tamil rather than Sri Lankan.

Population settlement
The Sri Lankan Canadian Population according to Statistics Canada in the 2006 census in the 10 Canadian Provinces and 3 territories:

Dual citizenship
Some Sri Lankan Canadians hold citizenship in both Canada and Sri Lanka. The Sri Lankan government encourage Sri Lankan expatriates to obtain the citizenship of their country of birth at a fee and to return to Sri Lanka at a future date. There is a drive to attract the educated Sri Lankan immigrants in Canada for new opportunities arising in the government sector of Sri Lanka (such as universities, research institutes etc.), which may sometime require the applicants to be Sri Lankan citizens.

Community

Ontario
Sri Lankan Organizations and Associations in Canada and their role:
There is a considerable number of Sri Lankan associations in Canada. The main objectives of these associations are to help the immigrants, continue their Sri Lankan traditions and to help Sri Lanka. Some of these associations are ethnic based but majority of the cities have associations which cater to all people having a link with Sri Lanka regardless of their ethnic or political orientation (E.g. [Tamil Cultural Association of Waterloo region [community organisation for Kitchener, Waterloo, Cambridge, Guelph, Brantford]).

List of Sri Lankan organizations and associations in Ontario:
 Sri Lankan Seniors Support Centre of Ottawa [SLSSCO] Not for Profit Corporation
 Canada Sri Lanka Muslim Association [Founded 1994, Oldest Sri Lankan Muslim Association in Canada]
 Sri Lanka Canada Association of Ottawa,
 Sri Lanka Malay Association of Toronto (SLAMAT)
 Ambalangoda Association,
 Sri Lanka Association of Cambridge, Guelph, Kitchener, and Waterloo
 Alumni Association of University of Peradeniya Canada - Ottawa Chapter
 Sri Lanka Canada Association Of Brampton
 Alumni Association of University of Peradeniya - Greater Toronto Area and Suburbs
 University of Colombo Alumni Association of Canada
 Waterloo Wellington Buddhist Cultural Association (WWBCA)
 University of Kelaniya Alumni Association of Canada
 NDT Canada Association- University of Moratuwa (Est 2008 )
 Canadian Sri Lankan Centre for Social Harmony

News Papers catering Sri Lankan Canadians
A number of newspapers are printed in Ontario to cater the Sri Lankan diaspora. They are printed in English, Tamil and Sinhalese languages and distributed free. These news papers mainly tell the stories from Sri Lanka (current and old) and talks about the achievements of Canadian Sri Lankans. Sometimes, they get into small discussions on Sri Lankan politics as well as give some general information and tips necessary to help immigrants survive in Canada. These newspapers can be picked up at some grocery stores where they sell Sri Lankan food, places of religious worship, etc.

List of Sri Lankan news papers available in Ontario.

 The Times of Sri Lanka
 Sri Lanka Reporter
 Analai Express
 Yathra
 Dasatha
 Canada Mirror

Manitoba
Organizations
Sri Lankan Association of Manitoba (SLAM)
Manitoba Buddhist Vihara and Cultural Association (MBVCA)
 Ottawa Theravada Buddhist Vihara and Cultural Center (OTBVCC) located at 2878, Navan Road, Orleans, Ottawa, ON K1C7G4 CANADA

Nova Scotia
Organizations
Sri Lanka Canada Association of Atlantic Region (SLCAAR)

Saskatchewan
Organizations
Saskatoon Sri Lankan Community

Notable Sri Lankan Canadians

Famous Sri Lankan Canadians include Michael Ondaatje and his financier brother Christopher Ondaatje;  Principal Research scientist at the National Research Council of Canada Chandre Dharma-wardana; Academic Engineer Indira Samarasekera, musician Nirmala Basnayake, formerly of the band controller.controller; news anchor Anne-Marie Mediwake; anchor novelist Shyam Selvadurai; cricketers Sanjayan Thuraisingam, film Actor, producer and multiple Guinness World Record-holder Suresh Joachim; and Pubudu Dassanayake.

See also

South Asian Canadian
Tamil Canadians

References

External links
 Canadian Tamil Business Directory
 Global Sri Lankan Forum

Ethnic groups in Canada
Asian Canadian
 
 
Sri Lankan diaspora
South Asian Canadian